Bers may refer to
Lipman Bers, Latvian-American mathematician, or to various mathematical concepts named after Bers:
Bers area inequality
Bers compactification
Bers density conjecture
Bers slice
Victor Bers, American classicist and son of the Latvian-American mathematician
Bers (Wales), or Y Bers, the Welsh name of the town of Bersham
Basse Bers and Haute Bers, villages in the Rimbach-près-Masevaux commune of northeastern France
BERS (software), an Australian computer program for House Energy Rating
Father Bers, a German writer who traced the origin of the Prayer to Saint Michael
Bers, the piece corresponding to the chess queen in the Mongolian board game Hiashatar
Bers., an abbreviation for the Italian Army rank of Bersagliere
Bers, another word for jujubes, the fruit of the Ziziphus mauritiana tree